Dong Hao (born 1956) better known by his nickname Uncle Dong Hao, is a former Chinese host, actor and painter.

He won the Golden Mike Award in 2009, and received the Flying Apsaras Award in 1987.

Biography
Dong was born in Beijing in 1956, with his ancestral home in Fengrun village of Tangshan city, the son of Dong Jingshan, a Chinese calligrapher. At the age of four, his father died of myocardial infarction. He graduated from Capital Normal University.

Dong joined the Beijing People's Broadcasting Corporation, he was transferred to China Central Television in 1990, he hosted Big Pinwheel since then.

On January 7, 2016, Dong Hao announced he is retired in Weibo.

Works

Television
 Big Pinwheel

Film
 Secret Plans (2014)

Awards
 1987 Flying Apsaras Award - Office Romance
 2009 Golden Mike Award

Personal life
Dong married Zhang Wei, the couple has a daughter, Dong Xiaoxiao.

References

1956 births
Male actors from Beijing
Capital Normal University alumni
Living people
Chinese television presenters
CCTV television presenters
Chinese children's television presenters
Chinese male television actors
Chinese male voice actors